Mount Fisher, also known locally as Fisher Peak, is a  mountain summit located in the Hughes Range of the Canadian Rockies in British Columbia, Canada. Situated east of historic Fort Steele and the Rocky Mountain Trench, this prominent peak is visible from the Crowsnest Highway and Cranbrook. Its nearest higher peak is Mount Morro,  to the north.

History

Mount Fisher was named in 1915 for John S. ("Jack") Fisher, a prospector who discovered gold in nearby Wildhorse Creek in 1863, and in 1864. The mining community that sprang up at Wildhorse Creek was called Fisherville, only to be razed in 1866 in order to work the ground where it stood.

The first ascent of the mountain was made in 1913 by A. Nichols and G. Lum. 

The mountain's name was officially adopted in 1924 when approved by the Geographical Names Board of Canada.

Following NHL championship seasons in 2000 and 2007, Cranbrook resident Scott Niedermayer posed atop the summit with the Stanley Cup.

Climate

Based on the Köppen climate classification, Mount Fisher  has a subarctic climate with cold, snowy winters, and mild summers.

See also
Geography of British Columbia

References

External links
 Weather forecast: Mount Fisher

Two-thousanders of British Columbia
Canadian Rockies
Kootenay Land District